The 1975 Centennial Cup is the fifth Tier II Junior "A" 1975 ice hockey National Championship for the Canadian Junior A Hockey League.

The Centennial Cup was competed for by the winners of the Western Canadian Champions and the Eastern Canadian Champions.

The finals were hosted by the Spruce Grove Mets in the city of Edmonton, Alberta, Canada.

The Playoffs

Prior to the Regionals
Bellingham Blazers (BCJHL) defeated Coquitlam Comets (PCJHL) 2-games-to-none
Guelph Biltmore Mad Hatters (SOJHL) defeated Toronto Nationals (OPJHL) 4-games-to-2
Smiths Falls Bears (CJHL) defeated Gander Flyers (NLJHL) 4-games-to-none
Gander Flyers (NLJHL) defeated Charlottetown Islanders (IJHL) 3-games-to-none

MCC Finals

Regional Championships
Manitoba Centennial Cup: Spruce Grove Mets

Abbott Cup: Spruce Grove Mets
Eastern Champions: Guelph Biltmore Mad Hatters

Doyle Cup: Spruce Grove Mets
Anavet Cup: Selkirk Steelers
Dudley Hewitt Cup: Guelph Biltmore Mad Hatters
Callaghan Cup: Smiths Falls Bears

Roll of League Champions
AJHL: Spruce Grove Mets
BCJHL: Bellingham Blazers
CJHL: Smiths Falls Bears
IJHL: Charlottetown Colonels
MJHL: Selkirk Steelers
NBJHL:
NJAHL: Gander Jr. Flyers
OPJHL: Toronto Nationals
PacJHL: Coquitlam Comets
QJAHL: St. Jerome Alouettes
SJHL: Swift Current Broncos
SOJAHL: Guelph Biltmore Mad Hatters
TBJHL: Thunder Bay Eagles

Awards
Most Valuable Player: Ron Lecuyer (Spruce Grove Mets)
Top Scorer: Ron Lecuyer (Spruce Grove Mets)

All-Star Team
Forward
Paul Messier (Spruce Grove Mets)
Ron Lecuyer (Spruce Grove Mets)
Wally Hogg (Guelph Biltmore Mad Hatters)
Defence
Tom Rieck (Guelph Biltmore Mad Hatters)
Jeff Elkow (Spruce Grove Mets)
Goal
Julian Baretta (Spruce Grove Mets)

See also
Canadian Junior A Hockey League
Royal Bank Cup
Anavet Cup
Doyle Cup
Dudley Hewitt Cup
Fred Page Cup
Abbott Cup
Mowat Cup

External links
Royal Bank Cup Website

1975
Cup